The 1968 Brownlow Medal was the 41st year the award was presented to the player adjudged the fairest and best player during the Victorian Football League (VFL) home and away season. Bob Skilton of the South Melbourne Football Club won the medal by polling twenty-four votes during the 1968 VFL season.

Leading votegetters

References 

1968 in Australian rules football
1968